Phyllonorycter obandai is a moth of the family Gracillariidae. It is known from the Rift Valley in the Central and Western provinces of Kenya.

The forewing ground colour is golden brown, with white markings consisting of a basal streak, three costal, and three dorsal strigulae. Adults are on wing from early December to early April.

Etymology
The species name is formed from the family name of the deceased Kenyan biologist Ernest Obanda.

References

Endemic moths of Kenya
Moths described in 2006
obandai
Moths of Africa